Bosnia and Herzegovina competed at the 2010 Winter Olympics in Vancouver, British Columbia, Canada.

Alpine skiing

Biathlon

Cross-country skiing 

Bosnia and Herzegovina has qualified two entrants in cross-country skiing.

See also
 Bosnia and Herzegovina at the Olympics
 Bosnia and Herzegovina at the 2010 Winter Paralympics

References

https://web.archive.org/web/20100204130744/http://www.okbih.ba/article/press-konferencija-21012010

Nations at the 2010 Winter Olympics
2010
Olympics